Language and Computers: Studies in Practical Linguistics is a book series on corpus linguistics and related areas. As studies in linguistics, volumes in the series have, by definition, their foundations in linguistic theory; however, they are not concerned with theory for theory's sake, but always with a definite direct or indirect interest in the possibilities of practical application in the dynamic area where language and computers meet.

The book series was founded in 1988 and is published by Brill|Rodopi.

Editors
Christian Mair
Charles F. Meyer

Volumes
Volumes include:
 # 77. English Corpus Linguistics: Variation in Time, Space and Genre. Selected papers from ICAME 32., Edited by Gisle Andersen and Kristin Bech.  E-
 # 76. English Corpus Linguistics: Crossing Paths., Edited by Merja Kytö.  E-
 # 75. Corpus Linguistics and Variation in English.Theory and Description., Edited by  Joybrato Mukherjee and Magnus Huber.  E-
 # 74. English Corpus Linguistics: Looking back, Moving forward. Papers from the 30th International Conference on English Language Research on Computerized Corpora (ICAME 30), Lancaster, UK, 27–31 May 2009., Edited by Sebastian Hoffmann, Paul Rayson and Geoffrey Leech.  E-
 #73. Corpus-based Studies in Language Use, Language Learning, and Language Documentation., Edited by John Newman, Harald Baayen and Sally Rice.  E-
 #72. The Progressive in Modern English. A Corpus-Based Study of Grammaticalization and Related Changes., by Svenja Kranich.  E-
 #71. Corpus-linguistic applications. Current studies, new directions, Edited by Stefan Th. Gries, Stefanie Wulff, and Mark Davies.. 
 #70. A resource-light approach to morpho-syntactic tagging., by Anna Feldman and Jirka Hana. 
 #69. Corpus Linguistics. Refinements and Reassessments., Edited by Antoinette Renouf and Andrew Kehoe. 
 #68. Corpora: Pragmatics and Discourse. Papers from the 29th International Conference on English Language Research on Computerized Corpora (ICAME 29). Ascona, Switzerland, 14–18 May 2008., Edited by Andreas H. Jucker, Daniel Schreier and Marianne Hundt. 
 #67. Modals and Quasi-modals in English., by Peter Collins. 
 #66. Linking up contrastive and learner corpus research., Edited by Gaëtanelle Gilquin, Szilvia Papp and  [http://www.ujaen.es/dep/filing/web_departamento/proferores/diez_belen.htm María Belén Díez-Bedmar]. 
 #64. Language, People, Numbers. Corpus Linguistics and Society., Edited by Andrea Gerbig and Oliver Mason. 
 #63. Variation and change in the lexicon. A corpus-based analysis of adjectives in English ending in –ic and –ical. , by Mark Kaunisto. 
 #62. Corpus Linguistics 25 Years on., Edited by Roberta Facchinetti. 
 #61. Corpora in the Foreign Language Classroom. Selected papers from the Sixth International Conference on Teaching and Language Corpora (TaLC 6), Edited by Encarnación Hidalgo, Luis Quereda and Juan Santana.  
 #60. Corpus Linguistics Beyond the Word. Corpus Research from Phrase to Discourse, Edited by Eileen Fitzpatrick.  
 #59. Corpus Linguistics and the Web., Edited by Marianne Hundt, Nadja Nesselhauf and Carolin Biewer. 
 #58. English mediopassive constructions. A cognitive, corpus-based study of their origin, spread, and current status'', by Marianne Hundt.  /

External links
Language and Computers on the publisher's website

Corpus linguistics
Linguistics books
Rodopi (publisher) books